Hat Full of Stars is the fourth studio album by American singer-songwriter Cyndi Lauper, released in 1993. The album was released 4 years after the singer's third studio album, A Night to Remember, which received unfavorable reviews and had low sales compared to the singer's previous releases. Hat Full of Stars received favorable reviews but was poorly received by the public, receiving gold certifications in Japan and France only.

Production and composition
Hat Full of Stars deviated from Lauper's pop-rock sound of previous projects and delved heavily into alternative music. It also furthered her growing penchant for writing topical songs about social issues. The album was recorded at the Hit Factory, Sigma Sound, Messina Sound, Right Track, The Enchanted Cottage, The Ranch, and World Famous Orbit Sound. It was co-produced by dance-music artist Junior Vasquez and is highly typical of his work of the time; as such, many of the songs are held together by synthetic loops and percussion. Lyrics address issues like abortion ("Sally's Pigeons"), racism ("A Part Hate"), spousal abuse ("Product of Misery" and "Broken Glass") and incest ("Lies").

The track "Product of Misery" was inspired by a teacher of Lauper's, Bob Barrell, who described the masses of struggling people as a 'product of misery' and that misery begets misery unless the chain is broken.

The song "A Part Hate" was conceived as an anti-apartheid song and was originally written for Lauper's second album True Colors but was not included because her label felt it would make the album too political; it already had a cover of Marvin Gaye's "What's Going On" and the title track included.

Lauper has commented that she wishes that her vocals on the project had been sharper. She worked with a vocal coach to sharpen her vocals for her next studio album Sisters of Avalon, and mentions this in the liner notes. The album cover was inspired by a photograph of the actress Mary Pickford, taken by photographer Nelson Evans.

Critical reception

The album received mostly favorable reviews from music critics. Holly George-Warren from Rolling Stone gave the album four out of five stars and wrote that the album is Lauper's "most ambitious". She praised Lauper's vocals ("her multioctave voice has never sounded better, hitting highs, lows and everything in between") and the musical arrangement for its "imaginative" combination of rootsy instrumentation and R&B staples, underpinned by dance-music mainstays. People magazine gave the album a favorable review in which it was said that the real strength of the album "is the way Lauper lets her feelings and opinions, dark as some of them are, emerge naturally" the review ended claiming that the "wacky energy that made Lauper perfect for the go-go ’80s is pretty much gone-gone, but Hat’s clear-eyed pop rock provides ’90s nourishment for body and soul." Tom Sinclair from Entertainment Weekly gave the album a B and wrote that it brings a diversity of rhythms and vocals to reach varied tastes he conclude that old fans of Lauper "probably won’t be disappointed by Hat Full of Stars" but he was skeptical about the record being able to garner a new audience for the singer.

Billboard magazine gave the album a positive review, stating that it marked a "metamorphosis" for Lauper from "fun-loving, she-bopping squealer" to a "mature artiste with admirable depth". The review highlighted the song "Who Let in the Rain" as reminiscent of Cyndi's 1984 hit "Time After Time". Other tracks noted as highlights were "A Part Hate", "Lies", which recalled "early Siouxsie & the Banshees", "Feels Like Christmas" and "Like I Used To", described as a "hybrid of Madonna-style pop and vintage Motown".

In negative reviews, Mike DeGaggne from AllMusic wrote that the singer "sounds much more appealing and enjoyable as an effervescent pop singer wading through simplistic and feel-good material rather than trying to befriend mildly opinionated pieces, which is what happens throughout most of Hat Full of Stars." Robert Christgau rated the album as a record that "may impress once or twice with consistent craft or an arresting track or two. Then it won't."

Commercial performance
The album was a commercial disappointment in the United States and despite some positive critical reviews it stalled at No. 112 on the Billboard 200 albums chart. As of 2003 the album has sold 119,000 copies in the United States, according to Nielsen SoundScan.

The album fared better overseas, becoming most successful in Japan and France, achieving a Gold certification in both countries. In Japan, the album spent a total of 7 weeks on the albums chart, peaking at 15. In France the album debuted at 10 before reaching its peak of 9 the following week. This was both her highest debut and peak for a studio album in France and it stayed in the Top 40 for 7 weeks.

The album achieved lower chart positions in the rest of Europe. In Germany, Hat Full of Stars entered the chart at 84 and re-entered at its peak of 52 two weeks later, spending a total of 9 weeks in the Top 100. The album spent four weeks on the Swiss albums chart, entering at 34 and climbing two positions higher to its peak in its second week. The album was released in the UK in November, entering the albums chart at 56 before dropping off the following week.

The tracks "That's What I Think", "Sally's Pigeons", "Hat Full of Stars" and "Who Let In the Rain" were released as singles; the latter of which was re-recorded in 2001 for her album Shine.

Track listing
"That's What I Think" (Cyndi Lauper, Eric Bazilian, Rob Hyman, Allee Willis) – 4:39
"Product of Misery" (Lauper, Bazilian, Hyman) – 4:11
"Who Let In the Rain" (Lauper, Willis) – 4:37
"Lies" (Lauper, Willis) – 3:40
"Broken Glass" (Lauper, Marv DePeyer, Junior Vasquez) – 5:34
"Sally's Pigeons" (Lauper, Mary Chapin Carpenter) – 3:48
"Feels Like Christmas" (Lauper, Bazilian, Hyman) – 4:35
"Dear John" (Lauper, Bazilian, Hyman) – 3:40
"Like I Used To" (Lauper, Willis) – 4:28
"Someone Like Me" (Lauper, Bazilian, Hyman, Willis) – 4:07
"A Part Hate" (Lauper, Tom Gray, David Thornton) – 4:56
"Hat Full of Stars" (Lauper, Nicky Holland) – 4:28 

Note
A track, "Cold", was recorded for the album but was omitted from the final track listing. It was released as the B-side to "Who Let In the Rain" and "Sally's Pigeons".

Personnel 

 Cyndi Lauper – lead vocals, backing vocals
 Jeff Bova – keyboards
 Nicky Holland – keyboards, acoustic piano, backing vocals 
 Rob Hyman – keyboards, Casio synthesizer, organ, accordion, melodica, backing vocals 
 Merv De Peyer – additional keyboards 
 Christopher Garcia – additional programming
 Fred McFarlane – keyboards
 Joey Moskowitz – keyboards, bass, drum programming
 Allee Willis – keyboards, Casio synthesizer, additional programming, bass, backing vocals 
 Peter Wood – keyboards, guitar, bass, drum programming, additional arrangements
 Eric Bazilian – acoustic piano, guitar, mandolin, dulcimer, bass, drum programming, saxophone, backing vocals 
 Carlos Alomar – guitar 
 Rick DiFonzo - guitar
 Nile Rodgers – guitar
 Larry Treadwell – guitar
 Kevin Jenkins – bass
 Bakithi Kumalo – bass
 Danny Sembello – bass
 Anton Fig – live drums
 David Uosikkinen – live drums
 Jimmy Bralower – drum programming
 Bashiri Johnson – congas
 Rob Paparozzi – harmonica
 Hugh Masekela – flugelhorn, backing vocals, vocal chant
 Deborah Fraser – backing vocals
 Georgia Jones – backing vocals
 Faith Kekana – backing vocals
 Lawrence Matshiza – backing vocals
 Junior Vasquez – backing vocals, additional arrangements 
 William Wittman – backing vocals
 Stella Zulu – backing vocals

Production 
 Cyndi Lauper – producer, recording, art direction, design
 Junior Vasquez – co-producer (1, 3–7, 8, 9, 10)
 William Wittman – additional production, recording (1-11), mixing (1, 5–8, 10, 11)
 Frank Filipetti – recording (1, 2, 3), mixing (2, 9)
 Dennis Mitchell – recording (1-11), mixing (4)
 Eric Bazilian – recording (2, 7, 8)
 Peter Wood – recording (3)
 Curt Frasca – recording (4, 9, 12)
 Christopher Garcia – recording (4, 9)
 Rob Paustian – recording (5, 12)
 Robin Irvine – recording (8)
 Alan Gregorie – recording (12)
 Goh Hotoda – mixing (3, 12), recording (12)
 Carl Glanville – assistant engineer
 Gary Tole – assistant engineer
 Ted Truwhella – assistant engineer
 Brian Wittmer – assistant engineer
 Jennifer Monnar – assistant engineer
 Stacy Drummond – art direction, design
 Dana Shimizu – design assistant
 Robert Lewis – photography
 David Thornton – drawings
 Laura Wills – styling
 Jody Morlock – makeup
 Danilo for Pierre Michel, NYC – hair

Charts

Weekly charts

Year-end charts

Certifications

Release history

References

External links
"Hat Full Of Stars" at discogs; click on "more images" for publishing

1993 albums
Cyndi Lauper albums
Epic Records albums
Quiet storm albums
Contemporary R&B albums by American artists
Soul albums by American artists